The Talk of Hollywood is a 1929 American musical comedy film directed by Mark Sandrich and starring Nat Carr, Fay Marbe and Hope Sutherland. It was shot at the New York studios of RKO Pictures. The film's sets were designed by the art director Ernst Fegté. The film parodies the rush by Hollywood to convert to sound film production in the late 1920s, and leading moguls such as Samuel Goldwyn.

Synopsis
Following the arrival of talkies, film tycoon J. Pierpont Ginsburg decides to throw all his money and energies into a musical extravaganza and imports a top French star from Paris to appear in it.

Cast
 Nat Carr as J. Pierpont Ginsburg 
 Fay Marbe as Adoré Renée 
 Hope Sutherland as Ruth Ginsburg 
 Sherling Oliver as John Applegate 
 Edward LeSaint as Edward Hamilton 
 Gilbert Marbe as Reginald Whitlock 
 John Troughton as The Butler 
 Al Goodman's Orchestra  as Al Goodman's Orchestra 
 The Leonidoff Ballet as Ballet Troupe

Production credits
The production credits on the film were as follows:
 Mark Sandrich - director and story
 Nat Carr - story
 Darby Aaronson - dialogue
 Frank Melford - production manager
 Harold Godsoe - assistant director
 Frank Kingsley - casting director
 Al Piantadosi - songs and orchestration
 Jack Glogau - songs and orchestration
 George Oschmann - recording engineer
 John Dolan - recording engineer
 Russell G. Shields - editor
 Ernst Fegté - art director
 Walter Strenge - chief cinematographer

References

Bibliography
 Munden, Kenneth White. The American Film Institute Catalog of Motion Pictures Produced in the United States, Part 1. University of California Press, 1997.

External links

1929 films
1929 musical comedy films
Films directed by Mark Sandrich
1920s English-language films
American black-and-white films
Films about filmmaking
American musical comedy films
1920s American films